Presidential elections were held in Madagascar on 3 November 1996, with a second round on 29 December 1996. The election followed the impeachment of incumbent President Albert Zafy and the appointment of his interim successor, Norbert Ratsirahonana.

In the first round, former President Didier Ratsiraka took first place with 36.6% of the vote with a turnout of 58.41%. However, as he failed to win more than 50% of the vote, a second round was held, in which Zafy, who had been able to run despite his impeachment, was the sole alternative. LEADER-Fanilo candidate Herizo Razafimahaleo, who took third place with 15.1%, backed Ratsiraka for the second round. Ratsirahonana, the acting President and Prime Minister, who stood as a candidate and received fourth place with 10.1% of the vote, backed Zafy.

In the second round, Ratsiraka achieved a narrow victory. On 6 January 1997, Zafy alleged that vote rigging and irregularities had occurred. Final results confirming Ratsiraka's victory were announced by the High Constitutional Court on 31 January, and he was sworn in on 9 February.

Results

References

Presidential elections in Madagascar
Madagascar
Presidential election
Malagasy presidential election
Malagasy presidential election